Semper Fi Fund is a non-profit 501(c)(3) organization that provides a variety of programs to assist wounded veterans in all branches of the United States Armed Forces. The organization describes its mission as "providing urgently needed resources and support for post-9/11 combat wounded, critically ill and catastrophically injured members of the U.S. Armed Forces and their families." As of November 2019, the Semper Fi Fund has issued 209,000 grants totaling $210 million in assistance to 24,000 service members and their families.

History

Formation
The Semper Fi Fund began in early 2003 as a gathering of military spouses around a kitchen table discussing ways to help Marines who had been injured during the invasion of Iraq. Early efforts included the distribution of snacks and toiletries at hospitals and a specialized van for a catastrophically injured Marine.

Incorporation
The nonprofit was officially incorporated as the Injured Marine Semper Fi Fund on May 17, 2004. General Alfred M. Gray, Jr., who served as the 29th Commandant of the Marine Corps from 1987 to 1991, was named the chairman of the board of the Semper Fi Fund and served in this position until November 2014.

First donation
The first official donation to the Semper Fi Fund was made by the Lighthouse Christian Church in Oceanside, California. Throughout 2004, the Semper Fi Fund received more than $2 million in donations.

Milestones
 On April 25, 2005, Cookie Magazine announced that Semper Fi Fund founder, president and CEO Karen Guenther and co-founders Wendy Lethin and Sondria Saylor,  were recipients of the first-ever Smart Cookie Awards, which recognize and support mothers in the business, philanthropy, and celebrity worlds who are making outstanding contributions to women's and children's causes around the globe. Other recipients included Mariska Hargitay, Marcia Gay Harden and Cynthia Nixon.
 In June 2007, the Semper Fi Fund announced that it had raised and given away more than $50 million in assistance to service members and their families.
 On November 19, 2007, the Semper Fi Fund received the Spirit of Hope Award at a Pentagon ceremony in which all branches of the service were recognized. The award, which was established by the Hope Family Foundation in 1997 in honor of Bob Hope, is for patriotism and service reflecting the essence of Bob Hope's dedication to those in the Armed Forces.
 On June 9, 2012, the Semper Fi Fund announced the creation of America's Fund, a self-funded program of the Semper Fi Fund created to direct urgently needed resources and financial support to injured and critically ill members of all branches of the U.S. Armed Forces and their families.
 In February 2013, Karen Guenther was named Marine Corps Spouse of the Year. (She had previously been nominated for 2011 Military Spouse of the Year.) In an interview on CBS This Morning on July 4, 2013, Guenther noted that since beginning the Semper Fi Fund in 2004 with $500, the organization had raised $101 million.
 On September 20, 2014, Karen Guenther was named an Honorary Marine by General James F. Amos, 35th Commandant of the Marine Corps.
 On November 17, 2014, Karen Guenther received the Zachary and Elizabeth Fisher Distinguished Civilian Humanitarian Award in a ceremony at the Pentagon.
 On January 28, 2015, the Semper Fi Fund announced they had crossed the $100 million mark in providing assistance to wounded, critically ill and injured service members and their families.
 On June 1, 2017, the Semper Fi Fund announced they had crossed the $150 million mark in providing assistance to wounded, critically ill and injured service members and their families.
 In 2017, the Semper Fi Fund  was presented the U.S. Special Operations Command Patriot Award for exceptional and enduring contributions to the welfare of Special Operations Command wounded warriors and their families from July 2003 to September 2017.
 In 2018, the Semper Fi Fund established the LCpl Parsons Welcome Home Fund designed to care for veterans from all U.S. military service branches who are catastrophically injured from combat operations in Vietnam.
 On January 21, 2020, the Semper Fi Fund announced that former chairman of the Joint Chiefs of Staff General Joseph F. Dunford, Jr. was named chairman of the board.

Fiscal year overviews
 In fiscal year 2013, the Semper Fi Fund provided 15,545 grants totaling $14,559,793 to 5,472 service members and families while the America's Fund program provided 578 grants totaling $1,151,777.
 In fiscal year 2015, the Semper Fi Fund provided 19,932 grants totaling $18,787,000 to 4,900 service members and their families., up from 160 reported in its 2013 annual report.
 In fiscal year 2016, the Semper Fi Fund provided 22,300 grants totaling $19,500,000 to 5,400 service members and their families.
 In fiscal year 2019, the Semper Fi Fund provided 29,200 grants totaling $24,114,000 to 6,600 service members and their families.

Operating overhead
The Semper Fi Fund has maintained an operating overhead of 7% on average since its inception.

Programs and Assistance

The Semper Fi Fund provides a wide variety of assistance to wounded, critically ill and injured service members. These programs are categorized into three main programs:

Service Member and Family Support Program
Described on the Semper Fi Fund website as providing "direct financial assistance and vital programming for combat wounded, critically ill and catastrophically injured service members and their families during hospitalization and recovery," the Service Member and Family Support Program includes:
 Bedside Financial Support that provides "needs-based financial assistance for expenses that are most pressing during a long hospitalization or rehabilitation. Typically families use this grant to help with additional travel and lodging expenses, childcare, and out of pocket expenses."
 Caregiver Support & Retreats that provide "coping tools and techniques for these amazing people who play such a critical role in the recovery process. The variety of activities are designed to reduce the challenges and stress experienced by caregivers all day, every day."
 Housing Assistance designed to help service members by providing funding toward the cost of modifying existing homes with modifications to accommodate handicapped service members in wheelchairs. The Housing Assistance Program also grants assistance to those who have fallen behind on their housing payment due to injury, recovery and rehabilitation costs. In fiscal year 2016, the Semper Fi Fund provided 2,275 housing assistance grants. An example of the Fund's work in this area was featured in February 2016 on The Today Show)
 Transportation Assistance that provides adaptive modes of transportation to include modified wheelchairs, vehicles and snow removal equipment..
 Kids Program, a week-long camp in which children of wounded, injured and critically ill service members are paired with high school student mentors. In its 2015 annual report, the Semper Fi Fund reported 171 campers and mentors participating in the program.
 Specialized & Adaptive Equipment grants that "cover many different types of equipment that can improve the quality of life for service members with disabilities. These include optic enhancement devices for the visually impaired, software programs for those who cannot type, specialized wheelchairs as needed and therapeutic mattresses for those with multiple injuries and burns."
 Visiting Nurse Program that provides emotional support, assistance in the development of coping skills, identifies health and wellness needs, gaps in care, and barriers to using a self-care management model.
 LCpl Parsons Welcome Home Fund designed to care for veterans from all U.S. military service branches who are catastrophically injured from combat operations in Vietnam.

Transition Program
The Semper Fi Fund describes their Transition Program on their website as a program that "makes it easier for wounded service members to thrive beyond injury to recovery. Education support and career assistance provides them with the tools and skills to successfully reconnect with their communities and build new, productive lives." The Transition Program includes:
 Education & Career Assistance designed to help service members with books, training fees, travel to job interviews, interview attire, computers, software and other equipment needed to pursue education opportunities and/or a new career. Through several partnership programs, this program also offers career-enhancing seminars and week-long workshops at no cost to the service member that help develop the networking, resume-writing and interview skills necessary to transition into the community workplace. In fiscal year 2016, the Semper Fi Fund provided transitional and long-term assistance grants to approximately 1,543 recipients.
 Veteran & Unit Reunions that provide a multi-day outdoor experience to servicemembers of a unit who deployed together.
 Veteran 2 Veteran Support (V2V), an integrated transition program that trains and empowers veterans (known as Veteran Leads) to help other veterans make a smoother transition back to civilian life.
 Semper Fi Fund Odyssey Retreat, a six-day, holistic transition assistance program for injured and critically ill service members in which participants learn how to transition into civilian life by learning about life-planning skills, establishing goals, employment resources, and by learning to balance four important MEPS elements: Mental, Emotional, Physical and Spiritual. 
 Semper Fi Fund Apprenticeship Program that establishes mentoring relationships with leading industry experts, providing a powerful and productive way for Service members to reintegrate into the community. The program assists service members with a 70% or greater disability rating find meaningful trades, careers and small business opportunities through short-term vocational education and apprenticeships.

Integrative Wellness Program
Described on their website as "inclusive wellness programs [that] provide targeted services and resources to meet the specific needs of those we assist," the Semper Fi Fund's Integrative Wellness Program includes:
 PTSD and TBI Support designed to address the consequences of exposure to blasts and explosions while in theater.
 NeuroFitness focusing on Neurofeedback training that helps restore cognitive function, improve memory, manage pain and assist with other stress-related issues.
 Specialized Equipment that has been prescribed or recommended by primary care physicians to help service members with injuries or illnesses, including Alpha-Stim, AVE, Emwaves, Irlen glasses, Celluma and others.
 Post-Traumatic Growth Video Resources, a comprehensive educational video series focusing on specific issues to assist today's post 9/11 service member.
 Doc’s Corner which provides information from the Fund's medical director, retired Navy Captain Dr. Robert Koffman
 Counseling grants for costs associated with therapy and counseling not covered by military benefits.
 Sports Program that is composed of service members who have overcome significant challenges in their service to our country and embraced the fighting spirit on their road to recovery.
 Jinx McCain Horsemanship Program that encourages and supports recovery and reintegration through camaraderie, individual achievement and the strength of the animal-human bond.
 Tim & Sandy Day Canine Companions Program that unites injured service members with service dogs while ensuring the dogs are properly trained. The program also assists financially with the continuous care for the dog while the injured service member physically rehabilitates and transitions back to civilian life.

Specific assistance

Specific assistance made in fiscal year 2019 and reported by the Semper Fi Fund in its 2019 annual report includes:
29,200 grants delivered to 6,600 service members and their families
19,000 grants delivered through the Service Member & Family Support Program
7,300 grants delivered through the Integrative Wellness Program
2,900 grants delivered through the Transition Program
 2,000 grants made to first-time grant recipients

Boston Marathon Bombing Survivors
In the aftermath of the April 15, 2013 Boston Marathon bombings, the Semper Fi Fund paid for a group of veterans to travel to Boston to assist the survivors of the bombings with information and moral support. According to Marine veteran B.J. Ganem, who lost his leg to an improvised explosive device in Iraq, the aftermath of the bombing, "looked exactly like something we saw in Iraq and Afghanistan." The organization began a separate fundraising effort, the Boston Marathon Relief Fund.

Notable Fundraising

Bob & Renee Parsons Foundation
 On January 30, 2019, the Semper Fi Fund announced that its year-end Double Down for Veterans fundraising campaign raised more than $20 million – including a $10 million match from The Bob & Renee Parsons Foundation, marking the seventh consecutive year that the foundation matched donations to the Semper Fi Fund and raising the foundation's cumulative total of donations to the Fund since 2012 to $51.2 million.
 On February 7, 2018, the Semper Fi Fund announced that it raised a total of $22.7 million during its annual "Double Down for Veterans" fundraising campaign. With the funds raised and the substantial $10 million matching contribution by The Bob & Renee Parsons Foundation, the campaign netted a total of $22,794,658 million in funding to support injured members of all branches of the U.S. Armed Forces and their families.
 On March 6, 2017, the Semper Fi Fund announced that it raised a total of $20 million during its annual fundraising campaign: The $10 million raised by the fund qualified it for a matching $10 million challenge grant from the Bob & Renee Parsons Foundation — marking the fifth consecutive year that GoDaddy founder Bob Parsons (a U.S. Marine Corps veteran and recipient of the Purple Heart, Combat Action Ribbon, and Vietnamese Cross of Gallantry) has provided matching funds to help military veterans and their families.
 On November 10, 2015, The Bob & Renee Parsons Foundation, with support from GoDaddy, announced the 10 Makes 20 Challenge, one of the largest matching campaigns in the history of veteran nonprofits. Through December 31, 2015, donations made to the Semper Fi Fund and America's Fund will be matched by The Bob & Renee Parsons Foundation, dollar-for-dollar, up to a total of $10 million—meaning a potential $20 million can be raised for the Semper Fi Fund
 On January 9, 2015, the Semper Fi Fund announced that a year-ending fundraising challenge in conjunction with GoDaddy and the Bob & Renee Parsons Foundation had raised $12 million.
 On January 7, 2014, the Semper Fi Fund announced that a two-month fundraising challenge in conjunction with GoDaddy and the Bob & Renee Parsons Foundation had raised $5 million.
 On October 10, 2013, the Semper Fi Fund announced that it had received a $1 million donation from the Bob & Renee Parsons Foundation.
 On December 8, 2012, GoDaddy announced that GoDaddy and The Bob and Renee Parsons Foundation presented the Semper Fi Fund with checks totaling $2 million.

Additional major donations
On May 17, 2017, Mission BBQ co-founders, Bill Kraus and Steve Newton presented a donation of $61,618 to Sergeant Major Carlton Kent, Semper Fi Fund Board member and 16th Sergeant Major of the Marine Corps. 
 In January 2017, former WNBA player Lisa Leslie raised $75,000 for the Semper Fi Fund competing on The New Celebrity Apprentice.
 On September 27, 2013, the Semper Fi Fund announced that it had received more than $1 million from Ride430, a group of 54 bicycle riders who make an annual 430-mile fundraising ride.
 On October 17, 2011, the Home Depot Foundation announced a $500,000 grant to the Semper Fi Fund.
 On March 7, 2011, the Semper Fi Fund announced it had received a $2 million donation from television personality Bob Barker.

Charity Watchdog Ratings

Charity Navigator
Provided the Semper Fi Fund with nine consecutive four-star ratings (only 3% of rated charities achieve this level of recognition), reflecting scores of 100 out of 100 for accountability and transparency and 97.50 out of 100 for financial performance. These rankings placed the Semper Fi Fund at the very top of Charity Navigator's list of charities performing similar types of work.

CharityWatch
Gives the Semper Fi Fund an A+ rating, one of only two of the 64 veteran and military charities reviewed to receive this highest ranking. CharityWatch lists the Semper Fi Fund as a Top-Rated Charity in their Veterans & Military category. According to Charity Watch, "groups included on the Top-Rated list generally spend 75% or more of their budgets on programs, spend $25 or less to raise $100 in public support, do not hold excessive assets in reserve, and receive "open-book" status for disclosure of basic financial information and documents to CharityWatch."

Daniel Borochoff, founder and president of CharityWatch, has said this about the Semper Fi Fund: "They give 93, 94 percent of their spending toward bona fide real programs that help veterans, and their cost to raise money is very small. It's only like 3 or 4 percent."

GuideStar
Provides the Semper Fi Fund with Platinum-level recognition, including the 2018 Platinum Seal of Transparency. According to the GuideStar website, "GuideStar Platinum encourages nonprofit organizations to share their progress and results in important new ways—moving way beyond simplistic financial ratios—to reflect the changes organizations are making in the world." As of January 2020, 41 personal reviews on GuideStar provided the Semper Fi Fund with an average rating of five stars.

References

External links 
Semper Fi Fund Website
Semper Fi Fund YouTube channel

American veterans' organizations
Charities based in California